Natalya Aleksandrovna Zabolotnaya (born 15 August 1985) is a Russian weightlifter.

Career
Zabolotnaya competed in the women's 75 kg weight class at the 2004 Summer Olympics in Athens and won the silver medal, lifting 272.5 kg in total. The result qualified as a world record, but it was also achieved by Pawina Thongsuk, who won the competition. Zabolotnaya won a gold medal in the 75 kg weightclass at the 2010 European Championship.

She originally was awarded the silver medal at the 2012 Summer Olympics in the women's 75 kg category with a total of 291 kg.  This result was an Olympic record, which was also achieved by Svetlana Podobedova who was awarded a medal the competition by virtue of lighter bodyweight, though Podobedova's medal was also subsequently stripped of her medal due to doping.  Zabolotnaya's 131 kg snatch was a (later nullified due to doping-related cheating) Olympic record.

In November 2016, Zabolotnaya was stripped of her 2012 Olympic medal after her drug sample tested positive.

Major results

References

External links

 
 
 
 

1985 births
Living people
Russian female weightlifters
Olympic weightlifters of Russia
Olympic silver medalists for Russia
Olympic medalists in weightlifting
Medalists at the 2004 Summer Olympics
Weightlifters at the 2004 Summer Olympics
Weightlifters at the 2012 Summer Olympics
World Weightlifting Championships medalists
World record holders in Olympic weightlifting
Doping cases in weightlifting
Russian sportspeople in doping cases
Competitors stripped of Summer Olympics medals
People from Salsk
European Weightlifting Championships medalists
Sportspeople from Rostov Oblast
21st-century Russian women